Gabriele Preuß (born 27 September 1954) is a German politician who served as a Member of the European Parliament (MEP) from 2014 until 2019. She is a member of the Social Democratic Party, part of the Party of European Socialists.

Prior to entering European politics Preuß undertook training at the Westphalia Chamber of Trades and the Northern Westphalia Chamber of Industry and Trade. She became a master craftsman and also later worked in administration. She was also involved in local politics, serving as a Member of Gelsenkirchen Municipal Council from 1999 until 2014. This included serving as Mayor from 2004 until 2014.

Parliamentary service
Member, Committee on Petitions (2014-2019)
Member, Committee on Transport and Tourism (2014-2019)
Member, Delegation to the EU-Turkey Joint Parliamentary Committee (2014-2019)
Member, Delegation to the ACP–EU Joint Parliamentary Assembly (2016-2019)

In addition to her committee assignments, Preuß served as a member of the European Parliament Intergroup on Western Sahara.

Other activities
 German United Services Trade Union (ver.di), Member
 Socialist Youth of Germany – Falcons, Member

References

1954 births
Living people
Social Democratic Party of Germany MEPs
MEPs for Germany 2014–2019
21st-century women MEPs for Germany
Mayors of places in North Rhine-Westphalia
Politicians from Dortmund
Women mayors of places in Germany